2024 McLaughlin, provisional designation , is an asteroid from the inner regions of the asteroid belt, approximately 8 kilometer in diameter. It was discovered 23 October 1952, by the Indiana Asteroid Program at Goethe Link Observatory near Brooklyn, Indiana, and named after American astronomer Dean Benjamin McLaughlin.

Orbit and classification 

McLaughlin orbits the Sun in the inner main-belt at a distance of 2.0–2.6 AU once every 3 years and 6 months (1,295 days). Its orbit has an eccentricity of 0.14 and an inclination of 7° with respect to the ecliptic.

Physical characteristics 

According to the survey carried out by NASA's Wide-field Infrared Survey Explorer with its subsequent NEOWISE mission, the asteroid measures 7.9 kilometers in diameter and its surface has an albedo of 0.173.

As of 2017, McLaughlins composition, rotation period and shape remain unknown.

Naming 

This minor planet was named in memory of American astronomer and geologist Dean Benjamin McLaughlin (1901–1965).

McLaughlin was an astronomical spectroscopist at Swarthmore College and the University of Michigan, and was the first to thoroughly measure stellar rotation, most notably the rotation of Algol. As a geologist he was one of the first to interpret the telescopically observable markings on Mars, which were later confirmed by direct observations from spacecraft (also see Albedo features). The lunar and Martian crater McLaughlin are also named in his honour. The official naming citation was published by the Minor Planet Center on 6 June 1982.

References

External links 
 Asteroid Lightcurve Database (LCDB), query form (info )
 Dictionary of Minor Planet Names, Google books
 Asteroids and comets rotation curves, CdR – Observatoire de Genève, Raoul Behrend
 Discovery Circumstances: Numbered Minor Planets (1)-(5000) – Minor Planet Center
 
 

002024
002024
Named minor planets
19521023